Blount may refer to:

People 
Blount (surname), surname of English derivation

Place names

Canada 
 Blount, Cochrane District, Ontario

England 
 Kingston Blount

United States 
 Blount, Georgia
 Blount, West Virginia
 Blount County (disambiguation)

Companies 
 Blount, Inc., equipment manufacturing company

See also 
Blunt (disambiguation)